Liqiao Town is a town on the south side of Shunyi District, Beijing. It shares border with Renhe Town in the north, Lisui Town in the east, Songzhuang Town in the south, and Tianzhu Town in the west. The town had 97,059 people residing within it in 2020.

The name Liqiao used to be Lijiaqiao due to its concentration of people with the last name Li.

History

Administrative divisions 
In 2021, Liqiao Town was composed of 35 subdivisions, more specifically 4 communities and 31 villages:

Gallery

See also 

 List of township-level divisions of Beijing

References 

Towns in Beijing
Shunyi District